Extraño en su pueblo (English: Stranger in the Village), is a Mexican telenovela produced by Ernesto Alonso for Televisa. Starring Rodolfo de Anda and Helena Rojo.

Plot 
Andrés Pereira is a man who has lived many years away from his hometown, San Lorenzo, learning different customs and adapting to a different lifestyle. However, when you decide to return discovers that his way of life no longer fits with the villagers, so that will not be well received.

Cast

References

External links 

1974 telenovelas
1974 Mexican television series debuts
1974 Mexican television series endings
Mexican telenovelas
Televisa telenovelas
Spanish-language telenovelas